SS Lusitania was a Portuguese twin-screw ocean liner of 5,557 tons, built in 1906 by Sir Raylton Dixon & Co, and owned by Empresa Nacional de Navegação, of Lisbon.

The ship was wrecked on Bellows Rock off Cape Point, South Africa at 24h00 on 18 April 1911 in fog while en route from Lourenço Marques (now Maputo), Mozambique, with 25 first-class, 57 second-class and 121 third-class passengers, and 475 African labourers. Out of the 774 people on board, eight died when a life boat capsized. On 20 April the ship slipped off the rock into  of water to the east of the rock. The wreck has become a fairly well known recreational dive site, but at 33 to 40 metres, it is deeper than recommended for the average recreational diver, and the currents and breakers over the reef make it a moderately challenging dive.

The sinking of Lusitania spurred the local authorities to construct a new lighthouse on the Cape Point.

References 

Passenger ships of Portugal
Shipwrecks of the South African Atlantic coast
20th century in Cape Town
Maritime incidents in 1911
Ships built on the River Tees
1906 ships